Erruppalem railway station is a small railway station in Telangana, Khammam district. Its code is YP. It serves Vijayawada city. The station consists of two platforms. The platforms are not well sheltered. It lacks many facilities including water and sanitation. This small station lies in the heart of the city near the chowk. It is another station to reach Vijayawada.

References

Vijayawada railway division
Railway stations in Khammam district